Paappi Devataa ( Sinners – Goddess; Hindi: पापी देवता) is a 1994 Indian Hindi-language action film, produced by M. M. Malhotra and Baldev Pushkarna and directed by Harmesh Malhotra. It stars Dharmendra, Jeetendra, Jayapradha, Madhuri Dixit and music composed by Laxmikant Pyarelal.

Plot 
Paappi Devataa is about Ram Kumar Singh, who re-locates himself from Allahabad to Bombay by train. During this time, his wallet and clothes are stolen. He registers a complaint with the railway police for his belongings stolen. Meanwhile, the very kind-hearted Rahim Khan takes him home and provides him with food, shelter, and a taxi-cab so that he can earn money while looking for a job. Eventually, they become close friends. While driving his taxi on his first day, Ram meets Reshma and both fall in love with each other. He then plans to search for a good job and move out to his own apartment. What Ram does not know is that Rahim works for an underworld Don, Ratan Seth, and has also killed a man named Niranjan Das. And what Rahim does not know is that Ram is the Deputy Commissioner of the Police, who suspects Rahim of killing Niranjan Das.

Cast 
 Dharmendra as Rahim Khan
 Jeetendra as Ram Kumar Singh
 Jaya Prada as Rosy
 Madhuri Dixit as Reshma
 Amrish Puri as Ratan Seth
 Ashalata Wabgaonkar as Rosie's mother
 Satyendra Kapoor as Niranjan Das
 Roopesh Kumar as Kundan
 Sharat Saxena as Ratan's employee
 Gurbachchan Singh as Gulzar Singh
 Yunus Parvez as Kelaram
 Shail Chaturvedi as train passenger
 Urmila Bhatt as Mrs. Khan
 Birbal as Havaldar
 Vinod Nagpal as Pandu

Soundtrack 
The music of the film was composed by Laxmikant Pyarelal.

External links 
 

Films set in Mumbai
Films scored by Laxmikant–Pyarelal
1990s Hindi-language films
Films directed by Harmesh Malhotra